Maine's 3rd congressional district is an obsolete congressional district.  It was created in 1821 after Maine achieved statehood in 1820 as part of the enactment of the Missouri Compromise.  It was eliminated in 1963 after the 1960 U.S. Census.  Its last congressman was Clifford McIntire.

List of members representing the district

References

 Congressional Biographical Directory of the United States 1774–present

03
Former congressional districts of the United States
1821 establishments in Maine
Constituencies established in 1821
1883 disestablishments in Maine
Constituencies disestablished in 1883
1885 establishments in Maine
Constituencies established in 1885
1963 disestablishments in Maine
Constituencies disestablished in 1963